Eusomalia is a genus of pill beetles in the family Byrrhidae. There is one described species in Eusomalia, E. lecontei.

References

Further reading

 
 

Byrrhidae
Articles created by Qbugbot